Yuri Mikhailovich Shevchuk (born 27 August 1990) is a Russian pair skater. With former partner Alexandra Vasilieva, he is the 2011 Russian Junior silver medalist and placed 11th at the 2011 World Junior Championships. The pair began skating together in May 2008 and were coached by Artur Dmitriev in Saint Petersburg. In March 2012, it was confirmed that Vasilieva/Shevchuk had ended their partnership and he had teamed up with Natalia Mitina. Mitina/Shevchuk are coached by Dmitriev and Natalia Pavlova in Moscow. They placed fourth at the 2013 Winter Universiade.

Programs 
(with Vasilieva)

Competitive highlights

With Mitina

With Vasilieva

References

External links
 
 
 Yuri Shevchuk at fskate.ru

Russian male pair skaters
1990 births
Living people
Figure skaters from Saint Petersburg
Competitors at the 2013 Winter Universiade